The Martin T3M was an American torpedo bomber of the 1920s. A single-engined three-seat biplane, it became a standard torpedo bomber of the U.S. Navy, operating from both land bases and from aircraft carriers from 1926 to 1932.

Development and design
Having built 75 examples of the Martin SC, the production version of the Curtiss CS in 1925, the Glenn L. Martin Company was able to offer an improved version when the U.S. Navy had a requirement for an improved torpedo-bomber/scout aircraft. This aircraft, which was designated the T3M-1, first flew in July 1926.

The T3M was a large single-engined biplane capable of being fitted with either a conventional tailwheel undercarriage or floats. The fuselage was constructed of welded steel tube in place of the riveted steel frame of the CS/SC, with the pilot and bombardier seated side by side in the front cockpit situated forward of the wing, with the bombardier having a position under the nose for aiming the aircraft's bombs or torpedoes, while the gunner had a cockpit well aft of the wing, with a radiator slung under the top wing between the cockpits. Power was from a 575 hp (429 kW) Wright T-3B V-12 engine. 24 T3M-1s were built.

As the T3M-1 was underpowered, a new version was produced with the much more powerful (770 hp/574 kW) Packard 3A-2500 engine. This version, the T3M-2 had revised wings with the upper and lower wings of equal span (while in the T3M-1 the lower wings were of greater span), and the radiator was replaced by two radiators on the fuselage side, allowing the crew to be moved to three individual tandem cockpits. The U.S. Navy ordered 100 T3M-2s, one of which was re-engined with the Pratt & Whitney Hornet and the Wright Cyclone radial engines as the XT3M-3 and XT3M-4 respectively. These aircraft formed the basis of the Martin T4M that would replace the T3M in service with the U.S. Navy.

Operational history

Deliveries of the T3M-1 to the U.S. Navy started in September 1926. The T3M-1 was not heavily used, however, and was replaced in service by the more powerful T3M-2 from 1927. Although the T3M-2 itself was replaced in frontline service by its radial-powered development, the T4M, it remained in squadron service until at least 1932.

Variants
T3M-1
Initial production version. Powered by 575 hp (429 kW) Wright T-3B engine. 24 built.
T3M-2
Main production version. One 770 hp (574 kW) Packard 3A-2500 engine. 100 built.
XT3M-3
First T3M-2 re-engined with Pratt & Whitney R-1690 Hornet radial engine.
XT3M-4
XT3M-3 modified by Naval Aircraft Factory to use Wright R-1750 Cyclone.

Operators

United States Marine Corps
United States Navy

Specifications (T3M-2)

See also

References

Notes

Bibliography

 Donald, David (editor). The Encyclopedia of World Aircraft. Aerospace Publishing. 1997. .
 Grossnik, Roy A. Dictionary of American Naval Aviation Squadrons: Volume 1 The History of VA, VAH, VAK, VAL, VAP and VFA Squadrons. Washington DC: Naval Historical Centre, 1995. .
 Johnson, Edward C. Marine Corps Aviation: The Early Years 1912–1940. Washington DC: U.S. Marine Corps, 1977.
 Swanborough, Gordon and Bowers, Peter M. United States Navy Aircraft since 1911. London:Putnam, Second edition 1976. .
 Taylor, Michael J.H. (ed.) Jane's Encyclopedia of Aviation.

External links

Martin T3M Aeroweb.
Martin Aerofiles.

Martin T03M
Martin T03M
T3M
Carrier-based aircraft
Single-engined tractor aircraft
Biplanes
Aircraft first flown in 1926